Anton Jørgen Andersen (Swedish:Anton Jörgen Andersen) (10 October 1845 – 9 September 1926) was a Norwegian composer and cellist.

Anton Jørgen Andersen was born in Kristiansand.  Andersen was a pupil in counterpoint by Johan Lindegren (1842-1908), Swedish  music theorist and hymn-book publisher.   Andersen  was a cellist in the theater orchestras of Trondheim (1865) and Kristiania (now Oslo).

In 1871 Andersen was employed at the Royal Court Orchestra (Kungliga Hovkapellet) in Stockholm. He became first cellist and violinist in the court orchestra in Stockholm  (kammarmusikus i hovkapellet) in 1876.  From 1876 to 1911, Andersen taught cello and double bass at the Stockholm Conservatory, where he was appointed professor in 1912.  In 1882 he became a member of the Royal Swedish Academy of Music (Kungliga Musikaliska Akademien).

His compositions include a cello sonata (1877), a concert piece for cello and double bass, and five symphonies (one of which was scored for 14 cellos and 3 double basses), as well as pieces for piano and songs for male choir.

References

1845 births
1926 deaths
19th-century classical composers
19th-century Norwegian male musicians
19th-century Norwegian composers
20th-century classical composers
20th-century Norwegian composers
20th-century Norwegian male musicians
Norwegian classical cellists
Norwegian classical composers
Norwegian male classical composers
Norwegian Romantic composers
Musicians from Kristiansand
Royal College of Music, Stockholm alumni
20th-century cellists